The 1999 Metro Atlantic Athletic Conference Men's Ice Hockey Tournament was the 1st championship since the founding of the ice hockey conference in 1997. It was played between March 13 and March 20, 1999. Quarterfinal games were played at home team campus sites, while the final four games were played at the Hart Center in Worcester, Massachusetts, the home venue of the Holy Cross Crusaders.

Format
The tournament featured three rounds of play with each round being single-elimination. In the first round, the first and eighth seeds, the second and seventh seeds, the third seed and sixth seeds, and the fourth seed and fifth seeds played with the winner advancing to the semifinals. In the semifinals, the highest and lowest seeds and second highest and second lowest seeds play with the winner advancing to the championship game.  The tournament champion does not receive an automatic bid to the 1999 NCAA Men's Division I Ice Hockey Tournament.

Conference standings
Note: GP = Games played; W = Wins; L = Losses; T = Ties; PTS = Points; GF = Goals For; GA = Goals Against

Bracket

Teams are reseeded after the quarterfinals

Note: * denotes overtime period(s)

Quarterfinals

(1) Quinnipiac vs. (8) Fairfield

(2) Holy Cross vs. (7) Sacred Heart

(3) Connecticut vs. (6) Iona

(4) Canisius vs. (5) American International

Semifinals

(1) Quinnipiac vs. (4) Canisius

(2) Holy Cross vs. (3) Connecticut

Championship

(2) Holy Cross vs. (4) Canisius

Tournament awards

MVP
Mike Maguire (Holy Cross)

Notes 
 Quinnipiac's 13 goals are a tournament record

References

MAAC Men's Ice Hockey Tournament
MAAC Men's Ice Hockey Tournament